Kezia is the debut full-length album by the Canadian progressive metal band Protest the Hero, first released in Canada on August 30, 2005, by Underground Operations. It is a concept album about a young girl (Kezia) sentenced to death, told from the perspectives of the various players involved in her sentencing and execution.

Overview
Production began in late 2004 overseen by Julius "Juice" Butty as their producer-in-chief (known for his work on Alexisonfire's gold-selling album Watch Out!). Kezia was released in Canada on August 30, 2005, and sold 500 copies in the first week and went on to sell more than 5000 copies in the next 2–3 weeks.

Kezia is a concept album, and was described by the band members as a "situationist requiem". In an interview from July 2006, Rody Walker describes the concept of the album:

Reception

The album received acclaim from many reviewers praising the album for its technicality and Walker's vocal range. Corey Apar of Allmusic states: "Sounding as if maximum emotion were packed into every second possible, each note of Kezia bleeds urgent passion — from the searing vocals of Rody Walker to blistering guitar leads to acoustic midsong breaks to compelling harmonies and growls alike." Furthermore, Kezia received a nomination from Toronto-based radio station 102.1 the edge for their 2005 CASBY Awards for Favorite New Indie Release.

The song "Bury the Hatchet" is available for download on the Xbox 360 version of Guitar Hero II. "Divinity Within" is also featured on the soundtrack to NHL 07.

Videos
Protest the Hero's second music video, for the song "Blindfolds Aside", was released in November 2005.  The video features members of the band as both condemned victims and executioners. "Blindfolds Aside" received light rotation on the Canadian music television station Much Music as well as brother channel Much Loud. The video was filmed in Toronto, Ontario.

The band filmed their third video for the song "Heretics and Killers" in mid-February 2006. It was released in April 2006. The video featured the band dressed as the flying monkeys from The Wizard of Oz who have lost their jobs (as a result of the Wicked Witch's death). The video is shot entirely in sepia until an explosive instrumental break-out in which vibrant colours are used for the remainder of the video.

On May 17, 2007, the band shot a video for their final single from Kezia, "The Divine Suicide of K".  It features a more gothic setting where the members of the group sing in an imaginary bar for female vampires.

Track listing

Personnel

Band members
Rody Walker — vocals
Tim Millar — guitar
Moe Carlson — drums
Luke Hoskin —  guitar, piano, backing vocals
Arif Mirabdolbaghi - bass, backing vocals

Other personnel
Jadea Kelly — vocals
Paul Distefano — vocals
Julius Butty — production, recording, mixing, additional vocals
London Spicoluk — vocals, executive production
Lucas Venditti - Vocals
Marco Bressette — additional guitars and string arrangements
Joao Carvalho — mastering
Garnet Armstrong — art direction and design
Ivan Otis — photography

References

Protest the Hero albums
2005 debut albums
Concept albums
Rock operas